Hyphessobrycon catableptus is a species of South American tetra, belonging to the family Characidae. Hyphessobrycon catableptus is known to live in the Essequibo River Basin, more specifically in the Takutu and Rupununi Rivers. This fish is benthopelagic, meaning that it resides away from the surface of the water.

General references 
 Hyphessobrycon catableptus (Durbin 1909) Map
 Hyphessobrycon catableptus (Durbin, 1909) Description

Characidae
Taxa named by Marion Durbin Ellis